Children of Lir or The Children of Lir may refer to:
The Fate of the Children of Lir, an Irish legend

Music
The Children of Lir, a cantata in the Irish language for orchestra, choir and soloists by Patrick Cassidy
Children of Lir, a song on the album Folk-Lore by folk metal-band Cruachan
The Children of Lir, symphonic poem composed by Hamilton Harty
The Children of Lir, a suite for orchestra, with narrator, by Robert Lamb
The Children of Lir, ballet composed by Adela Maddison
The Children of Lir (Loudest Whisper album) 1974, credited to Brian O'Reilly and featuring Donovan

Other uses
The Children of Lir, sculpture in Dublin's Garden of Remembrance by Oisín Kelly